Anatoli Petrovich Zarapin (born 13 June 1947) is a Russian professional football coach and a former player.

External links
  Career profile at Footballfacts

1947 births
Sportspeople from Karaganda
Living people
Soviet footballers
Association football goalkeepers
FC Torpedo Moscow players
FC Metalist Kharkiv players
FC Shakhter Karagandy players
Russian expatriate sportspeople in Kazakhstan
FC Lokomotiv Moscow players